Michael Weiss (born August 2, 1976) is an American former competitive and currently professional figure skater. He is in the U.S. Figure Skating Hall of Fame and is a three-time national champion (1999, 2000, 2003) a two-time World bronze medalist (1999, 2000), and a two-time Olympic team member.

Personal life
Michael Weiss was born August 2, 1976, in Washington, DC. His father, Greg, was a gymnast on the 1964 Olympic team, and his mother, Margie, was also a gymnast and national champion. His sister Geremi was a figure skater and junior national silver medalist; his other sister, Genna, was junior world diving champion.

Weiss graduated from Wilbert Tucker Woodson High School in Fairfax, Virginia. He holds an associate degree in business marketing from Prince George's Community College. Weiss was a member of the Phi Theta Kappa Honor Society. In September 1997, he married his jazz dance teacher, Lisa Thornton. Their daughter, Annie-Mae, was born in September 1998 and their son, Christopher Michael, in October 1999.

Career
Weiss began skating in 1986. Audrey Weisiger coached him from the age of nine. Weiss took the silver medal at the 1993 World Junior Championships in Seoul, South Korea and won gold at the 1994 World Junior Championships in Colorado Springs, Colorado.

At the 1997 U.S. Championships, Weiss attempted to become the first American to land the quad toe loop. It was initially believed to have been successful but three hours after the competition, U.S. Figure Skating ruled that the jump had been two-footed and decided not to ratify it. He pulled up from fifth after the short program to take the silver medal behind Todd Eldredge and was sent to Lausanne, Switzerland to compete at his first World Championships, where he finished seventh.

In February 1999, Weiss won his first senior national title at the U.S. Championships in Salt Lake City, Utah. The following month, he was awarded the bronze medal at the 1999 World Championships in Helsinki, Finland. After recovering from a stress fracture in his left ankle, Weiss defended his national title at the 2000 U.S. Championships in Cleveland, Ohio and won bronze at the 2000 World Championships in Nice, France.

Weiss missed part of the 2000–01 season due to a stress fracture in his foot. At the start of the 2002–03 season, Don Laws filled in for Weisiger at the Campbell's Classic. On October 29, 2002, Weiss decided to leave Weisiger to train full-time with Laws.

Weiss competed 19 consecutive years at the U.S. Championships. He was the first American to land a quadruple toe loop in competition. He invented the "Tornado", a backflip with a full twist, and debuted it at the Hallmark Skaters Championship in December 2002. Though not allowed in competition, it is a crowd favorite in exhibitions.

Weiss turned professional in 2006. He toured with Stars On Ice and competed in Ice Wars. Around 2012, he began teaching skating skills to hockey players.

Michael Weiss Foundation
While still an eligible skater, Weiss started the Michael Weiss Foundation, which gives scholarships to up-and-coming figure skaters. Skaters who have received scholarships include Nathan Chen, Adam Rippon, Ashley Wagner, Mirai Nagasu, Madison and Keiffer Hubbell, Daisuke Murakami, and Christine Zukowski.

Programs

Competitive highlights
GP: Champions Series / Grand Prix

References

External links

MichaelWeiss.org - Official website

USOC Bio Page - US Olympic Committee Biography

1976 births
American male single skaters
Figure skaters at the 1998 Winter Olympics
Figure skaters at the 2002 Winter Olympics
Living people
Olympic figure skaters of the United States
Figure skaters from Washington, D.C.
Sportspeople from Fairfax County, Virginia
World Figure Skating Championships medalists
Four Continents Figure Skating Championships medalists
World Junior Figure Skating Championships medalists
Universiade medalists in figure skating
Goodwill Games medalists in figure skating
Universiade gold medalists for the United States
Competitors at the 1995 Winter Universiade
Competitors at the 1994 Goodwill Games
Competitors at the 1998 Goodwill Games
Competitors at the 2001 Goodwill Games
Wilbert Tucker Woodson High School alumni